{{DISPLAYTITLE:C6H6}}
The molecular formula C6H6 (molar mass: 78.114)

 Benzene
 Benzvalene
 Bicyclopropenyl
 Dewar benzene
 Fulvene
 Prismane
 [3]Radialene
 3-Methylidenepent-1-en-4-yne
 Hexadiyne
 1,3-Hexadiyne
 1,4-Hexadiyne
 1,5-Hexadiyne
 2,4-Hexadiyne
Hexadienyne
1,2-Hexadien-4-yne
1,2-Hexadien-5-yne
1,3-Hexadien-5-yne
1,5-Hexadien-3-yne (Basavraj)
2,3-Hexadien-5-yne

Historical and hypothetical compounds:
 Claus' benzene

References